Ruminiclostridium hungatei is an obligately anaerobic, cellulolytic, mesophilic and nitrogen fixing bacterium from the genus of Clostridium which has been isolated from soil in Amherst in the United States.

References

 

Bacteria described in 2001
Oscillospiraceae